= Lebanese National Road Championships =

National road cycling championships in Lebanon

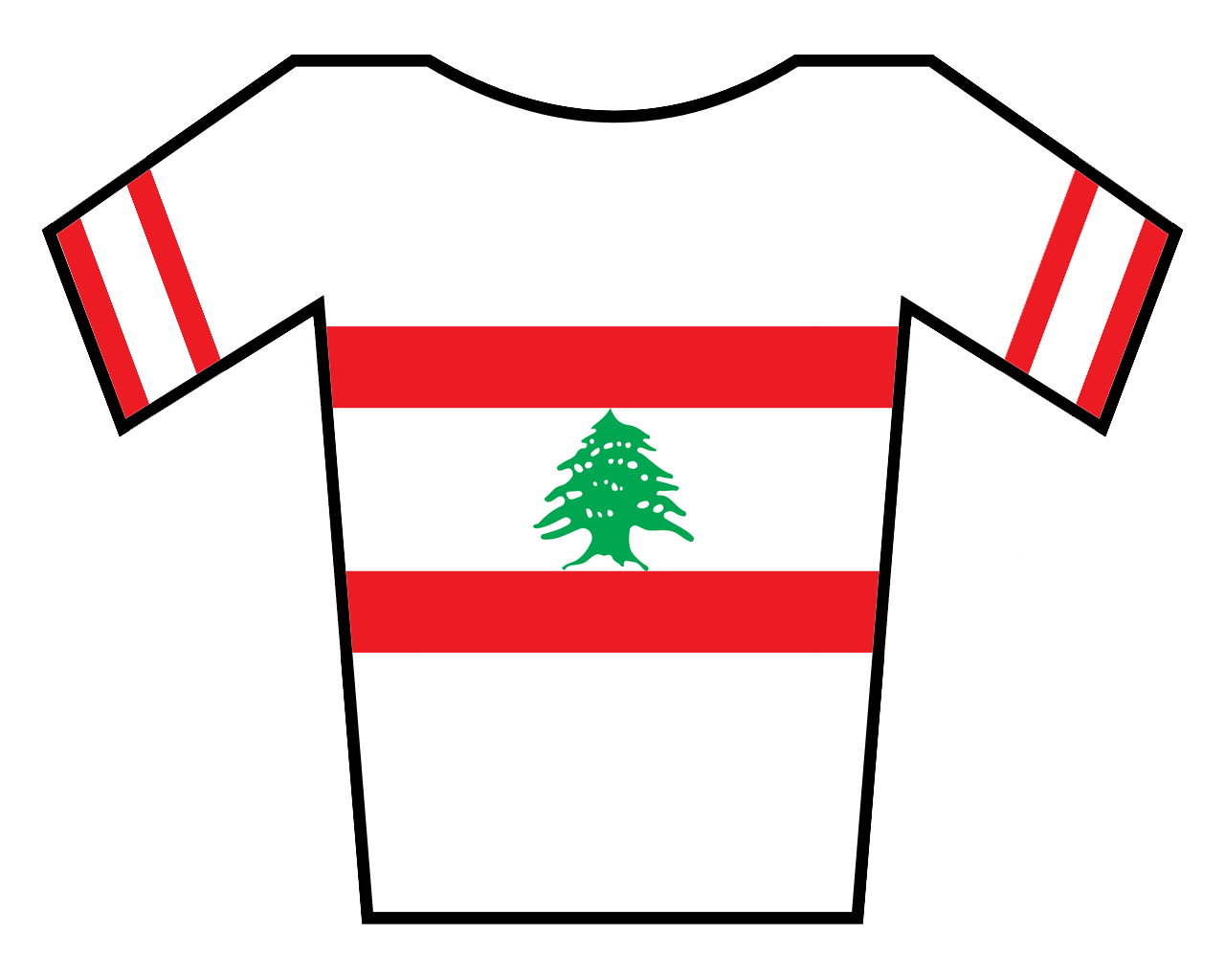

Race details
- Date: June
- Discipline: Road
- Type: One-day race

The Lebanese National Road Championships are held annually to decide the cycling champions in both the road race and time trial discipline, across various categories.

== Men ==
=== Road race ===
Year	Winner	Second	Third
2007	Salah Ribah	Zaher Al Hage	Haig Melikian
2009	Zaher Al Hage	Abdullah Arab	Samir Lian
2011	Salah Ribah	Zaher Al Hage	Ahmed Murad
2012	Nabil Tabbal	Zaher Al Hage	Youcef Nader
2013	Hassan Al Hajj	Ahmad Mourad	Salah Ribah
2014	Zaher Al Hage	Hassan El Hajj	Salah Ribah
2015	Elias Abou Rachid	Zaher Al Hage	Youssef Nader
2016	Elias Abou Rachid	Zaher Al Hage	Roy Roukoz
2017	Elias Abou Rachid	Abdallah Al Err	Salah Ribah
2018	Elias Abou Rachid	Hovsep Kanlejian	Abdallah Al Err
2019	Gilbert Hannouche	Zaher Al Hage	Jihad Al Ahmad
2021	Gilbert Hannouche	Jihad Al Ahmad	Abdallah Salloum
2022	Gilbert Hannouche	Othman Adra	Abdel Azez Almane

=== Time trial ===
Year	Winner	Second	Third
2007	Kevork Altounian	Zaher Al Hage	Samir Lian
2008	Zaher Al Hage	Haig Melikian	Garo Kelechian
2009	Zaher Al Hage	Samir Lian	Abdullah Arab
2013	Salah Ribah	Hassan Al Hajj	Zaher Al Hage
2014	Elias Abou Rachid	Khalil El Asmar	Kevork Altounian
2015	Elias Abou Rachid	Kevork Altounian	Zaher Al Hage
2016	Kevork Altounian	Elias Abou Rachid	Ramzy Yazbek
2017	Abdallah Al Err	Kevork Altounian	Salah Ribah
2018	Abdallah Al Err	Salah Ribah	Kevork Altounian
2019	Georges Wadih	Jihad Al Ahmad	Hagop Kechicha

== Women ==
Year	Road Race	Time Trial
2006	Lina Rahme	Lina Rahme
2007-2019	"Not Held"	
